Middlemount Airport  is located at Middlemount, Queensland, Australia.

Airlines and destinations

See also
 List of airports in Queensland

References

Airports in Queensland